Bradley J. Cook is an American historian and academic administrator serving as the 17th president of Snow College in Ephraim, Utah.

Early life and education 
Cook is a native of central Utah. After earning an associate degree from Snow College, he earned a Bachelor of Arts in international relations and a Master of Arts in the social science of education from Stanford University. He later earned a Doctor of Philosophy in Middle East studies from the University of Oxford.

Career 
From 1999 to 2006, Cook was the vice president of Utah Valley University for academic affairs. From 2006 to 2009, he was the president of the Abu Dhabi Women's College. From 2009 to 2019, he was the executive vice president and provost of Southern Utah University. He became the 17th president of Snow College in May 2019.

References 

Living people
Year of birth missing (living people)
Snow College alumni
Stanford University alumni
Alumni of the University of Oxford
Utah Valley University people
Southern Utah University people
Snow College faculty